Babyhood usually refers to the state of being an infant.

Babyhood may also refer to:

 Babyhood (Paul Reiser book), 1996 comedic autobiographical memoir
 Babyhood, 1974 popular science book by Penelope Leach
 Babyhood: Rhymes and Stories, Pictures and Silhouettes for Our Little Ones, 1878 children's book by Laura E. Richards
 Babyhood, 1923 magazine founded by De Lysle Ferree Cass
 Baby Bonnie Hood, also known as "B.B. Hood", character from the Darkstalkers videogame series

See also
 Childhood (disambiguation)
 Baby (disambiguation)